Higinio Chávez García (born 10 January 1959) is a Mexican politician affiliated with the Party of the Democratic Revolution (PRD). Between 2006 and 2009 he served as a deputy to the LX Legislature of the Mexican Congress representing the Federal District's 14th district.

References

1959 births
Living people
Politicians from Mexico City
Party of the Democratic Revolution politicians
21st-century Mexican politicians
Members of the Congress of Mexico City
Deputies of the LX Legislature of Mexico
Members of the Chamber of Deputies (Mexico) for Mexico City